Cycloponympha hermione is a moth in the Lyonetiidae family. It is known from Xinavane, Mozambique.

This species has a wingspan of 9 mm. Head and antennae are white, the forewings are white with the costal edge dark fuscous towards base and some pale ochreous suffusions and grey marks.

Related pages
List of moths of Mozambique

References

Endemic fauna of Mozambique
Lyonetiidae